Ancylis subarcuana is a species of moth belonging to the family Tortricidae.

It is native to Eurasia.

References

Enarmoniini